The Utah Utes football program is a college football team that represents the University of Utah. The team has had 23 head coaches since organized football began in 1892. Harvey Holmes was the first paid head coach, and the Utes have had 17 paid, professional head coaches. The Utes have played in more than 1,000 games during its 116 seasons. In those seasons, 5 coaches have led the Utes to postseason bowl games: Ike Armstrong, Ray Nagel, Ron McBride, Urban Meyer, and Kyle Whittingham. 7 coaches have won conference championships with the Utes: Thomas Fitzpatrick, Armstrong, Jack "Cactus Jack" Curtice, Nagel, McBride, Meyer, and Whittingham. Armstrong is the all-time leader in number of games coached with 211, years coached with 25, and total wins with 141. Meyer is the all-time leader in winning percentage with a percentage of .917 in his two seasons at Utah. Tom Lovat is, in terms of winning percentage, the worst coach the Utes have had with a percentage of .152 during his three seasons as head coach (with the exception of Walter Shoup who only coached one game in 1895.)

Of the 23 Utes head coaches, Ike Armstrong has been inducted into the College Football Hall of Fame. Kyle Whittingham is the current head coach and has received National Coach of the Year honors from multiple organizations. He was hired in December 2004.

Key

Coaches

Notes

References
General

Specific

Utah

Utah sports-related lists